George Samuel Graham (23 December 1874 – 11 April 1952) was a New Zealand accountant, lawyer, ethnographer and native agent. He was born in Auckland, New Zealand on 23 December 1874. His grandfather was George Graham, a parliamentarian, and his mother was the sister of John Sheehan, a cabinet minister. Graham was a member of the Polynesian Society and researched Maori history, language, culture and artefacts.

References

1874 births
1952 deaths
People from Auckland
New Zealand accountants
New Zealand ethnologists
20th-century New Zealand lawyers